Myles Edwards (born 19 May 1997) is an English rugby union player who players for Toshiba Brave Lupus in the Top League.

A late starter, he only began playing rugby at the age of sixteen. He joined the Worcester Warriors AASE development programme, combining rugby with studying at Worcester Sixth Form College.

After a year at Sixways, he moved to France with Top 14 side La Rochelle, where he spent during the 2016-17 season. That was followed by a season with Pro D2 outfit Aurillac for the 2017-18 season. On 31 May 2018, Edwards left to join Pro D2 rivals Oyonnax on a two-year deal from the 2018-19 season.

On 19 May 2020, Edwards returns to England to join Wasps in the Premiership Rugby from the 2020-21 season. However, Edwards  left Wasps to sign for Japanese side Toshiba Brave Lupus in the Top League competition.

References

External links
All Rugby Profile
Its Rugby Profile
Ultimate Rugby Profile

1997 births
Living people
English rugby union players
Rugby union players from West Midlands
Sportspeople from Handsworth, West Midlands
Rugby union locks